Marc Raubenheimer (Durban, 31 March 1952 – Madrid, 7 December 1983) was a South African pianist. Marc was taught by Miss Ethel Kerkin of Durban North, South Africa. She was a true genius of the art and it was she who mentored Marc throughout his life. Marc was fortunate to have teaching from many performing pianists including Alicia de la Roche who took a very special interest in Marc's musical career, and was a good friend. Of Miss Kerkin, Marc is remembered to have said that when he needed a "proper lesson" he came back to Ethel Kerkin. Those who knew him, remember that he memorized the 24 Bach Preludes and Fugues over a weekend as financial constraints forced him to borrow the music on short loan (Prof A. Linegar, Cape Town, South Africa).

Later Years
Later, a disciple of Friedrich Gulda in Munich, he graduated in London, debuting at the Wigmore Hall in 1978. For the next years he settled in London and took part in its musical scene while he made headway to the American scene, debuting in Carnegie Hall. He extended his concerts through Austria, Germany and Switzerland and performed regularly in his homeland, where he was awarded the South African Radio prize. Raubenheimer was the first guest soloist who performed with the then newly formed KwaZulu Natal Philharmonic Orchestra (South Africa) from September 1983. In a busy opening season he played 2 concerts a week for 3 weeks, in the cities of Durban and Pietermaritzburg, performing the five Beethoven piano concertos, conducted by David Tidboald. His discographical debut (Decca), a Schumann monographic, was arranged for Spring 1984. Marc's performance of Schumann repertoire was described by critics as sublime, and one of the best interpretations heard at the time.

Final Years & Death
In 1982 Raubenheimer won the Paloma O'Shea Santander International Piano Competition. As he traveled to the final recital entailed by the prize he was tragically killed (on 7 December 1983) in a collision of airliners at Madrid, Spain.

External links
 Biography and critical acclaim
 Article in El País. Enrique Franco, 19/02/83
 Account of the Barajas tragedy, detailing the celebrities involved, El Mundo, 6/12/98

References

1952 births
1983 deaths
Musicians from Durban
South African classical pianists
Prize-winners of the Paloma O'Shea International Piano Competition
Sydney International Piano Competition prize-winners
20th-century classical pianists
Victims of aviation accidents or incidents in 1983
Victims of aviation accidents or incidents in Spain